Sink or Swim is the second full-length studio album from Californian hardcore punk band, Over My Dead Body. It was released in July 2003 on Takeover Records. Indecision Records also released it in limited edition vinyl pressings of 159 blue, 175 green, 600 turquoise, and a further 110 on black, with a novelty cover.

Track listing
"Why Are You Here"  	– 1:29  	    	  
"Anchors Aweigh" 	– 1:52 	  	 
"Broken Backs"	– 1:44 	  	 
"Bricks" 	– 1:13 	  	 
"Patriotic Cattle Call" 	– 1:16 	  	 
"Tunnel Vision" 	– 2:50 	  	 
"Dead Alive" 	– 0:59 	  	 
"Don't Call It a Comeback" 	– 0:47 	  	 
"The 23rd Letter" 	– 2:32 	  	 
"Remembrance Day" 	– 1:19 	  	 
"The Kippax" 	– 1:23 	  	 
"Always and Forever" 	– 1:55 	  	 
"The Cold Front" 	– 1:33

Credits
 Daniel Sant – vocals
 Mike Arney – guitar 
 Aaron Cooley – guitar
 Adam Meehan – bass
 Tommy Anthony – drums
 Recorded March – April, 2003
 Produced by Paul Miner and Over My Dead Body

External links
 Indecision Records album page

2003 albums
Over My Dead Body (band) albums
Indecision Records albums